is a town located in Suzu District, Ishikawa Prefecture, Japan.

As of 2003, the town had an estimated population of 7,332 and a density of 136.21 persons per km². The total area was 53.83 km².

On March 1, 2005, Uchiura, along with the former town of Noto, and the village of Yanagida (both from Fugeshi District), was merged to create the new town of Noto (in the newly created Hōsu District, Ishikawa, which was created at the same day) and no longer exists as in independent municipality.

This place was quite small and has a small body of water near it.

References

External links
 Official website of Noto in Japanese

Dissolved municipalities of Ishikawa Prefecture
Noto, Ishikawa